Giovanni Giacomo Cavallerini (1639–1699) was a Roman Catholic cardinal.

Biography
Giovanni Giacomo Cavallerini was born on 16 Feb 1639 in Rome. 
On 30 Jun 1692, he was consecrated bishop by Fabrizio Spada, Cardinal-Priest of San Crisogono, with Michelangelo Mattei, Titular Archbishop of Hadrianopolis in Haemimonto, and Baldassare Cenci (seniore), Titular Archbishop of Larissa in Thessalia, serving as co-consecrators. 

Cavallerini died on 18 Feb 1699 in Rome, Italy.

References

1639 births
1699 deaths
17th-century Italian cardinals
Apostolic Nuncios to France